TETRAPOL (Terrestrial Trunked Radio POLice) is a digital professional mobile radio standard, as defined by the Tetrapol Publicly Available Specification (PAS), in use by professional user groups, such as public safety, military, industry and transportation organizations throughout the world. Airbus Defence and Space is the main supplier of this technology.

Description
TETRAPOL is a fully digital, FDMA, professional mobile radio system for closed user groups, standardizing the whole radio network from data and voice terminal via base stations to switching equipment, including interfaces to the Public switched telephone network and data networks. End-to-end encryption is an integral part of the standard.

Tetrapol Publicly Available Specifications (registration required) has detailed information and an overview picture.

History
Matra/EADS developed TETRAPOL and delivered an operational digital trunked radio system at an early date. Among the first users was the French National Gendarmerie in 1988 for its RUBIS system.

TETRAPOL currently has 80 networks deployed in 34 countries.

EADS (Connexity) and Siemens (S-PRO) are among the major manufacturers of professional radio systems based on the TETRAPOL specification.

In 2012 the Brazilian federal police bought a networks to use the FIFA World Cup.

Alternative Solutions

TETRA is an open standard by ETSI. TETRA is a more recent standard than Tetrapol taking over concepts from cell phones. It is favored in Europe for its extensibility and lower entry barrier for competitors in the market. Networks can be found worldwide.

dPMR is an open standard by ETSI. dPMR is a more recent standard than TETRA. It offers voice and data and a better spectrum efficiency than TETRA. It can also be used in unlicensed 446 MHz spectrum.

DMR is a limited open digital mobile radio standard defined by ETSI and used in commercial products around the world. It's also seen widespread success within the ham radio community mainly due to low costs.

P25 is an open standard by the Telecommunications Industry Association (TIA). The system is favored in North America for its upgrade option on existing analogue radio networks in the area. Other networks can be found worldwide (South and Central America, Asia, Europe, Middle East, Oceania and Africa).

Notes

External links
 TETRAPOL Portal
 TETRAPOL Factsheet also comparing it to TETRA by the Swiss Federal Office of Communications
 SELECOM is a well-established French designer and manufacturer of TETRA / TETRAPOL repeaters
Digital Radio: Wireless Solution for Audio and Date Trafic is a paper that Prof. Dr. Cristiano Torres do Amaral presented in a conference about Tetrapol.

Trunked radio systems
Emergency communication